Bhola-3 is a constituency represented in the Jatiya Sangsad (National Parliament) of Bangladesh since 2010 by Nurunnabi Chowdhury of the Awami League.

Boundaries 
The constituency encompasses Lalmohan and Tazumuddin upazilas.

History 
The constituency was created in 1984 from a Bakerganj constituency when the former Bakerganj District was split into four districts: Bhola, Bakerganj, Jhalokati, and Pirojpur.

Members of Parliament

Elections

Elections in the 2010s 

In October 2009, the Supreme Court upheld a ruling that Major (retired) Jashim Uddin's 2008 candidacy was illegal because he failed to wait the statutory five years after compulsory retirement from government service before running for parliament. The Election Commission vacated the seat on February 3, 2010. Nurunnabi Chowdhury was elected in the resulting April 2010 by-election.

Elections in the 2000s

Elections in the 1990s

Notes

References

External links
 

Parliamentary constituencies in Bangladesh
Bhola District